Stanley Phillip Lord (13 September 1877 – 24 January 1962) was captain of the SS Californian, the nearest ship to the Titanic on the night it sank on 15 April 1912, and, depending on which sources are believed, likely the only ship to see the Titanic, or at least its rockets, during the sinking. 

Lord, and the Californian more generally, have been criticised for the fact that the Californian did not render timely assistance to the Titanic despite being between 5 and 20 miles away, according to the testimony of various witnesses, and the only ship that could have reached Titanic before she sank. Two official inquiries were critical of Lord, but did not recommend criminal charges. Subsequent authors have offered differing opinions on Lord's actions, with some defending, and others criticising him. The passion among the two factions has resulted in the labels of "Lordites" and "Anti-Lordites" being applied to the two camps. 

Central points of debate typically include the appropriateness of Lord's response to the rockets, whether the Californian and Titanic were in fact visible to one another (and additionally the visibility of the rockets), the possible presence of one or more "Mystery Ships" that may have been the ships seen by either the Titanic or Californian (assuming they did not in fact see each other), and whether or not the Californian could have saved any additional lives had it attempted to render assistance more quickly.

Early life 
In February 1901, at the age of 23, Lord obtained his Master's Certificate, and three months later, obtained his Extra Master's Certificate. He entered the service of the West India and Pacific Steam Navigation Company in 1897. The company was taken over by the Leyland Line in 1900, but Lord continued service with the new company, and was awarded his first command in 1906.

Lord was given command of the SS Californian in 1911.

Personal life 
Lord was married and had a son. His wife, Mabel, died in 1957, and Lord died in 1962. It was suggested that the stress of attempts to exonerate himself had contributed to the deterioration of his own health after his wife's death. Their son, Stanley Tutton Lord (1908–1994), worked as a banker in Liverpool; he never married or had children. He lived as a bachelor until his death from natural causes in 1994. He rarely spoke of his father, except to say he believed in his innocence. In 1965 he wrote a preface to a book by Peter Padfield, The Titanic and the Californian, which supported the case for Lord having been judged unfairly.

Titanic sinking

Before the sinking 
On the night of 14 April 1912, as the Californian approached a large ice field, Captain Lord decided to stop around 10:21 p.m. (ship's time) and wait out the night. Before turning in for the night, he ordered his sole wireless operator, Cyril Evans, to warn other ships in the area about the ice. When reaching the Titanic, Evans tapped out "I say old man, we are stopped and surrounded by ice." The Californian was so close to the Titanic that the message was very loud in the ears of Titanic First Wireless Operator Jack Phillips, who angrily replied "Keep out! Shut up! I am working [i.e., communicating with] Cape Race." Earlier in the day the wireless equipment aboard the Titanic had broken down and Phillips, along with Second Wireless Operator Harold Bride, had spent the better part of the day trying to repair it. Now they were swamped with outgoing messages that had piled up during the day and Phillips was exhausted after such a long day. Evans listened in for a while longer as Phillips sent routine traffic through the Cape Race relaying station before finally turning in for bed at around 11:30 p.m.

Night of Titanic sinking 
Over the course of the night, officers and seamen on the deck of Californian witnessed eight white rockets fired into the air over a strange ship off in the distance.

Fatigued after 17 hours on duty, Captain Stanley Lord was awakened twice during the night and told about the rockets, to which he replied that they may be "company rockets", to help ships identify themselves to liners of the same company.

Meanwhile, on the Titanic, for an hour after the collision, no other ships were noticed until the lights of a ship were seen in the distance. Fourth Officer Joseph Boxhall and Quartermaster Rowe tried in vain to contact the strange ship by Morse lamp. Nobody on the deck of the Californian saw these signals; however, they had also tried to signal the mystery ship, but were unable to get a response.

Authors Tim Maltin and Eloise Aston attribute Captain Lord's belief that the nearby ship was not the Titanic to visual distortions caused by cold-water mirages. Not able to understand any messages coming from the strange ship, Californian's officers eventually concluded that signals were merely the masthead flickering and not signals at all.

Throughout the night, no one on board the Californian attempted to wake their wireless operator, and ask him to contact the ship to ask why they were firing rockets and trying to signal them, until 5:30 a.m. By then, however, it was too late — the Titanic had gone down at 2:20 a.m. When she had slipped below the water, the sudden disappearance of lights was interpreted by the Californian crew to mean that she had simply steamed away.

Search and recovery 
On the morning of 15 April 1912, Captain Lord was notified by the Frankfurt that the Titanic had gone down early that morning. At 8:45 a.m, the Californian pulled up alongside the Carpathia and stayed behind to search for additional bodies after the Carpathia steamed towards New York.

Lord's testimony 
The following is from Captain Lord's testimony in the US Inquiry on 26 April:

Reputation 
While Lord was never tried or convicted of any offence, he was still viewed publicly as a pariah after the Titanic disaster. His attempts to fight for his exoneration gained him nothing, and the events of the night of 14–15 April 1912 would haunt him for the rest of his life.

Lord was dismissed by the Leyland Line in August 1912. So far as any negligence of the SS Californians officers and crew was concerned, the conclusions of both the American and British inquiries seemed to disapprove of Lord's actions but stopped short of recommending charges. While both inquiries censured Lord, they did not make any recommendations for an official investigation to ascertain if he was guilty of offences under the Merchant Shipping Acts. Lord was not allowed to be represented at either the U.S. or British inquiry.

In February 1913, with help from a Leyland director who believed he had been unfairly treated, Lord was hired by the Nitrate Producers Steamship Co., where he remained until March 1927, resigning for health reasons. In 1958, Lord contacted the Mercantile Marine Service Association in Liverpool in an effort to clear his name. The association's general secretary, Mr. Leslie Harrison, took up the case for him and petitioned the Board of Trade on his behalf for a re-examination of the facts, but there had been no finding by the time of Lord's death in 1962. In 1965, largely because Lord had offered no new evidence, his petition was rejected, but in the same year Peter Padfield's book The Titanic and the Californian was published, defending Lord's reputation, with a preface by his son Stanley Tutton Lord. This was followed by a second petition, in 1968, which was also rejected.

In 1957, Lord's wife died. It was a devastating loss to him, and precipitated a decline in his health. In 1958 the film A Night To Remember was released, based on a 1955 book of the same title by Walter Lord (no relation). Stanley Lord, now 81 years old, never saw the film, but purportedly read the Liverpool Echo newspaper reviews of the film. Lord was very disappointed, and it brought back memories of the Titanic tragedy, and was upset over his negative portrayal by the Australian-British actor Russell Napier, which depicted him as a captain in his forties, in a warm cabin in his pyjamas in bed asleep when Titanic was sinking. In reality, Lord was 34 years old at the time and was asleep in the chart room with his uniform on at the time of the disaster.  Lord's son Stanley Tutton Lord saw the film, and was upset how his father was treated after the Titanic tragedy. In 1959 Stanley helped fight to get his father's name cleared from the records of the Titanic disaster. He continued his attempts after his father's death in 1962, up until his own death in 1994.

The discovery in 1985 of the remains of the Titanic on the sea bed made it clear that the S.O.S. position given after the iceberg collision by the Titanic's fourth officer, Joseph Boxhall, was wrong by thirteen miles. At both of the 1912 inquiries, there had been some conflict about the true position of the ship when it sank. The conclusions of the inquiries discounted the evidence of uncertainty about the position of the Titanic. At the time, some assumed that the position which Lord had given for his ship was incorrect and that he was actually much closer to the Titanic than he claimed to be. While the entries in the Californian'''s scrap log (used for recording information before it was written up officially in the ship's logbook) referring to the night in question had mysteriously gone missing, sometimes seen as overwhelming proof that Lord deliberately destroyed evidence in order to cover his crime of ignoring a distress call, destroying the scrap log records was actually normal company practice. While modifying the official ship's log or removing pages is a serious violation of maritime law, this was not the case. A re-appraisal by the British government, instigated informally in 1988 and published in 1992 by the Marine Accident Investigation Branch (MAIB), further implicated the consequences of Lord's inaction. Among its conclusions were that although the Californian was probably out of visual sight, the Titanics rockets had been sighted by the Californians crew. Another conclusion stated that it was unrealistic to assume that Lord could have rushed towards the signals, and that with the Titanic reporting an incorrect position, the Californian would have arrived at about the same time as the Carpathia and fulfilled a similar role – rescuing those who had escaped. The report was critical of the behavior of the other officers of the Californian in reaction to the signals. What has never been satisfactorily resolved was why Lord did not simply wake his radio operator and listen for any distress signals.

Daniel Allen Butler, in his 2009 book The Other Side of Night: The Carpathia, the Californian, and the Night Titanic Was Lost, makes a case that Lord's personality and temperament — his behaviour at both inquiries, his threats towards his crew, his frequent changing of his story, the absence of the scrap log, and odd remarks made by Lord in Boston in a newspaper interview – point to Lord's having some sort of mental illness. His lack of compassion — never once expressing grief at the loss of the Titanic or sorrow for those who had lost family when she sank is, according to Butler, compatible with sociopathy. 

Butler's claims about Lord have been countered by Titanic historian and author, Dr. Paul Lee, who pointed to the numerous testimonials Lord received throughout his career for good conduct and the fact that, in the aftermath of the Titanic furore, people were willing to risk their own reputations to help Lord find employment with a new shipping line. Lee further argued that if Lord were such a tyrant, then the officers and sailors who willingly served under him on multiple voyages would surely not have done so. In his book The Titanic and the Indifferent Stranger, Lee noted the lack of reliable witnesses. Those on the Titanic were in the midst of a trauma, while those on board the Californian had an obvious reason to want to avoid blame. Navigational techniques of the time meant that the Titanics CQD position being wrong did not necessarily mean that the Californian was farther away, since the Californians position was likely wrong as well. Lee was also critical of both Lord and Stone for not reacting appropriately to the rockets, which should have been easily and universally understood as distress signals. He pointed to Lord's question about what color the rockets were as evidence of his ignorance, since rockets of any color indicated distress. Lee acknowledged that the question of potential "Mystery Ships" is unlikely to ever be resolved, due to both poor record keeping as well as the fact that this issue was not well researched at the time. However Lee points out that this obscures the fact that, even if the rockets did not come from the Titanic, the Californian still ignored some other ship's distress signals. Overall, he was quite critical of Lord and his defenders, especially Leslie Harrison, whom Lee accused of attempting to suppress works critical of Lord. Despite this position, Lee concluded nonetheless that the Californian probably would not have saved many, if any, additional lives, pointing out that a rescue by the Californian would still have necessitated lowering the lifeboats, but Titanics officers were unable to even launch all of the lifeboats they had. Lee further hypothesized that, given the reluctance of many passengers to leave the ship in the early stages of the evacuation, the sight of an approaching ship might have provided further discouragement to board the lifeboats, leading to more deaths rather than fewer.

Captain Lord died on 24 January 1962, aged 84, almost half a century after the sinking of the Titanic. He is buried in Rake Lane Cemetery  Wallasey.

 References 

 Further reading 
 Biography of Captain Stanley Lord – from Encyclopedia Titanica
 Peter Padfield, The Titanic and the Californian (1965)
 Reade, Leslie (1993). The Ship That Stood Still. New York: Norton and Company. .
 Lee, Paul The Titanic and the Indifferent Stranger'', 14 February 2012
 Maltin, Tim "A Very Deceiving Night", Malt House Books, 15 April 2012
 "A TITANIC MYTH"..Leslie Harrison
 Dyer, David (2016) "The Midnight Watch", Atlantic Books, 2016

External links 
 Titanic and the Mystery Ship
 Stanley Lord's testimony at the US inquiry into the Titanic sinking
 Stanley Lord's testimony at the British inquiry into the Titanic sinking
 Titanic In Lancashire Museum Project

1877 births
1962 deaths
RMS Titanic
Burials in Merseyside
People from Bolton
British Merchant Navy officers